Mayravank (literally "mother monastery") is a ruined medieval Armenian monastery located near the village of Solak in Armenia's Kotayk Province. Today, only the Surb Astvatsatsin (Holy Mother of God) Church of the 11th-12th centuries stands. It is located atop a cliff surrounded by evergreen trees.

Gallery

References

Tourist attractions in Kotayk Province
Buildings and structures in Kotayk Province